Zalema is a white Spanish wine grape variety planted mainly in Condado de Huelva. As a varietal, Zalema produces heavy, full bodied wines.

Synonyms
Zalema is also known under the synonyms Del Pipajo, Perruna, Torrontes de Motilla, Ignobilis, Rebazo, Salemo, Salerno, Zalemo, and Zalemo Rebazo.

References

Andalusian cuisine
Spanish wine
Grape varieties of Spain
White wine grape varieties